Liverij Osipovich Darkshevich (– March 28, 1925) was a Russian neurologist who was a native of Yaroslavl. His surname is sometimes spelled Darkschewitsch in medical literature.

From 1882 to 1887 he studied medicine at the University of Moscow, and afterwards worked and studied at the laboratory of Theodor Meynert (1833-1892) in Vienna, the laboratory of Paul Flechsig (1847-1929) in Leipzig, Karl Westphal's clinic in Berlin, and at the Salpêtrière in the clinic of Jean-Martin Charcot (1825-1893). During this time period, he also collaborated with Joseph Jules Dejerine (1839-1917) and Sigmund Freud (1856-1939) on a number of important medical papers.

From 1892 to 1917 Darkshevich was director of the department of neurology at the University of Kazan, where he founded a neurological clinic and laboratory. He was the first editor-in-chief of the Kazan Medical Journal (Казанский медицинский журнал). In 1917 he became a professor of neurological diseases at the University of Moscow.

He is remembered for his description of the nucleus of the posterior commissure, also known as the "nucleus of Darkshevich", defined as a cell group located in the central gray substance of the upper end of the cerebral aqueduct, in front of the oculomotor nucleus.

References 
 Parts of this article are based on a translation of an article from the Polish Wikipedia.
 Online Medical Dictionary
 

Russian neurologists
1858 births
1925 deaths
Moscow State University alumni
Professorships at the Imperial Moscow University
Academic staff of Moscow State University
Imperial Moscow University alumni
People from Yaroslavl